
Sępólno County is a unit of territorial administration and local government (powiat) in Kuyavian-Pomeranian Voivodeship, north-central Poland. It came into being on January 1, 1999, as a result of the Polish local government reforms passed in 1998.

As of 2019 its total population is 41,055, out of which the population of Sępólno Krajeńskie is 9,091, that of Więcbork is 5,950, that of Kamień Krajeński is 2,390, and the rural population is 23,624.

Neighbouring counties
Sępólno County is bordered by Człuchów County and Chojnice County to the north, Tuchola County to the north-east, Bydgoszcz County to the south-east, Nakło County to the south, and Piła County and Złotów County to the west.

Administrative division
The county is subdivided into four gminas (three urban-rural and one rural). These are listed in the following table, in descending order of population.

References

 
Land counties of Kuyavian-Pomeranian Voivodeship